Monardella odoratissima (mountain coyote mint, mountain beebalm, mountain monardella or mountain pennyroyal) is a perennial  flowering plant which grows in mountain forests and sagebrush scrub. It is a member of the mint family (Lamiaceae). It has the minty odor characteristic of this family.

Distribution
Monardella odoratissima is found in montane forests above 600 m. and below 3100 m. It is found in many Northern California mountain ranges, including the Klamath Mountains and the North California Coast Ranges, the Cascade Range, the Sierra Nevada, the Modoc Plateau,  White Mountains and Inyo Mountains. Outside California, it is found as far north as Washington, and as far east as Utah and western Colorado.

Description
Monardella odoratissima is an upright to sprawling perennial herb which can be woody at the base. It ranges from 30 centimeters to one meter-3 feet in height and equally wide. The plant can be either a smooth dark green or a hairy dark grey-green, with many gradations in between. It is often dotted with glands which release a strongly minty odor when the plant is touched.

The leaves can lance-shaped to ovate, and are smooth-edged. They measure up to 4.5 centimeters long.

The flowers range in color from white and pale pink to light bluish-purple. The inflorescence is a head, which can be from 10 mm. to 25 mm. wide, with outer bracts which are like leaves, and inside bracts which enclose the many flowers like a cup. These bracts can be hairy or smooth, and sometimes have a rose or purplish color. The calyx, which is inside these bracts, is hairy and has 5 lobes. The corolla is tubular and has two lips. The upper lip is erect and has two lobes, but the lower lip curves downward and has 3 lobes. It has 4 stamens, and a style which has two unequal lobes.

The fruits, like most of fruits of the mint family, are 4 smooth nutlets which are dark brown to black in color.

Cultivation
Monardella odoratissima is easy to grow as a Garden plant. Although the Monardellas are in the mint family, most Monardellas do not grow from runners. However, they can still be propagated easily from cuttings.

They are very attractive to butterflies, which are their main pollinator.

Monardella odoratissima will grow in full sun to medium shade. It can be pruned lightly in the late fall or early winter to create a bushier plant, as they can otherwise be sprawling. They bloom profusely anytime from April through August. Because they are floriferous, they look best when spent blooms are deadheaded.

References

 Abrams, Leroy; 1951. Illustrated flora of the Pacific States, Stanford University Press

External links 
 Jepsn Manual Treatment - Monardella odoratissima
 USDA PLANTS Database - Monardella odoratissima
 Monardella odoratissima - Photo gallery

odoratissima
Flora of California
Flora of Oregon
Flora of Nevada
Flora of Washington (state)
Flora of the Sierra Nevada (United States)
Flora of the California desert regions
Garden plants of North America
Drought-tolerant plants
Groundcovers
Butterfly food plants
Flora without expected TNC conservation status